Apple Gabriel (born Albert Craig) (April 24, 1955 – March 23, 2020) was a Jamaican singer. - Israel Vibration - Herb Is The Healing

Biography
Gabriel was a member of the Jamaican reggae group Israel Vibration. Like the other members of the group, Gabriel suffered from polio.  Gabriel wrote about his experience contracting polio and how he was treated in the community on his official website on the ‘History’ section.

He left the group in 1996 not sure of the time, and recorded three albums with RAS Records, TP Records, and Reper.

Discography
An Apple A Day (1994, Reper)
Another Moses (1999, RAS Records)
Give Me M.T.V (2001, TP Records)
Teach Them Right (2010, jahsolidrock)

References

1955 births
2020 deaths
20th-century Jamaican male singers
Afro-Jamaican
21st-century Jamaican male singers